Nalbandan (also Romanized as Na‘lbandān; also known as Qulwīs) is a village in Howmeh Rural District, in the Central District of Khodabandeh County, Zanjan Province, Iran. At the 2006 census, its population was 992, in 212 families.

References 

Populated places in Khodabandeh County